Franz Josef Gerstner (from 1810 Franz Josef Ritter von Gerstner, ; 23 February 1756 – 25 July 1832) was a German-Bohemian physicist, astronomer and engineer.

Life 
Gerstner was born in Komotau in Bohemia then part of the Habsburg monarchy. (Today it's Chomutov in the Czech Republic). He was the son of Florian Gerstner (1730–1783) and Maria Elisabeth, born Englert. He studied at the Jesuits gymnasium in Komotau. After that he studied mathematics and astronomy at the Faculty of Philosophy at the Charles-Ferdinand University in Prague between 1772 and 1777. In 1781 he started to study medicine at the University of Vienna, but later decided to quit his studies. Instead, he worked as an assistant at the astronomical observatory in Vienna under supervision of Maximilian Hell. In 1784 he returned to Prague, where he got a position at the Klementinum astronomical observatory in Prague. In 1789 he became professor of higher mathematics, mechanics and hydraulics at the University in Prague.

In 1792 Gerstner married Gabriele von Mayersbach († 1808). They had nine children including Franz Anton von Gerstner (1796-1840).

In 1795 Gerstner became a member of the government commission which tried to improve higher technical education in the Austrian empire. Following his suggestion, the old engineering school in Prague was converted by the decree of Emperor Joseph I to a polytechnic school in 1803. The new Polytechnic Institute in Prague was officially opened on Nov. 10th 1806, and Gerstner became its first director. In 1811 he was appointed by the Emperor to the position of the Director of hydraulic engineering in Bohemia.
 
In 1823, due to an illness, he was forced to stop his classes at the University. Gerstner died and was buried in Mladějov, Bohemia, in 1832.

Work 
From his works the most influential was Handbook of mechanics. This fundamental text-book was published in three volumes (1831, 1832 and 1834), with more than 1400 subscribers.

In 1804 Gerstner published a pioneering work Theory of water waves. The so-called Gerstner wave is the trochoidal wave solution for periodic water waves – the first correct and nonlinear theory of water waves in deep water, appearing even before the first correct linearised theory.

His work focused on applied mechanics, hydrodynamics and river transportation. He helped to build the first iron works and first steam engine in Bohemia. 

In 1807, he proposed the construction of a horse-drawn railway between the Austrian Empire towns of České Budějovice and Linz, one of the first railways on the European continent. The construction of this railway was started in summer 1825 by his son Franz Anton (Ritter) von Gerstner (1796, Prague - 1840, Philadelphia). The regular transport between České Budějovice and Linz started on August 1st, 1832.

Honors 
Between 1802 and 1803, Gerstner served as a chairman of the Royal Bohemian Society of Sciences.

In 1808, he received the Imperial Order of Leopold.

In 1810, Gerstner was elevated to the nobility as Ritter von Gerstner.

Legacy 
The polytechnic school founded by Gerstner exists till today as the Czech Technical University in Prague (ČVUT).

The institute for artificial intelligence and cybernetics research at ČVUT bears the name Gerstner Laboratory.

Writings 
 Über die Bestimmung der geographischen Längen, Berichtigung der Längen von Marseille, Padua, Kremsmünster, Dresden, Berlin und Danzig. Prague 1785
Vorübergang des Merkur vor der Sonne. Beobachtet am 4. Mai 1786. Prague and Dresden 1786
Beobachtung der Sonnenfinsternis am 4. Juni 1788 auf der k. Sternwarte zu Prag. Prague and Dresden 1788
Eine leichte und genaue Methode für die Berechnung der geographischen Länge aus Sonnenfinsternissen. Berlin Astronomisches Jahrbuch 1788, s. 243-247
Einleitung in die statische Baukunst. Prague 1789
 Merkur vor der Sonne zu Prag den 5. Nov. 1789. Prague 1790
 Vergleichung der Kraft und Last beim Räderwerke mit Rücksicht auf Reibung. Prague 1790
As coauthor: J. Jelinek, Abbe Gruber, Th. Haenke and F.J. Gerstner. Beobachtungen auf Reisen nach dem Riesengebirge. Dresden 1791
Über die, der wechselseitigen Anziehung des Saturns und Jupiters wegen erforderlichen Verbesserungen der Beobachtungen des Uranus, zur richtigen Erfindung der Elemente seiner wahren elyptischen Bahn. Berlin. Jahrbuch 1792
 Theorie des Wasserstosses in Schussgerinnen mit Rücksicht auf Erfahrung und Anwendung. Prague 1795
 Versuche über die Flüssigkeit des Wassers bei verschiedenen Temperaturen. Prague 1798
Theorie der Wellen: samt einer daraus abgeleiteten theorie der deichprofile. Prague 1804
 Mechanische Theorie der oberschlächtigen Räder. Prague 1809
 Zwei Abhandlungen über Frachtwägen und Strassen. Prague 1813
 Abhandlung über die Spirallinie der Treibmaschinen. Prague 1816
Bemerkungen über das hydrometrische Pendel. Prague 1819
Vorschlag zur Erweiterung der von den böhmischen HH. Ständen im J. 1806 zu Prag errichteten polytechnischen Lehrinstituts. Prague 1820
Bemerkungen über die Festigkeit, Elasticität und Anwendung des Eisens bei dem Bau der Kettenbrücken. Prague 1825
Handbuch der Mechanik in three parts
1. Mechanik fester Körper. Spurny, Prague 1831
2. Mechanik flüssiger Körper. Spurny, Prague 1831
3. Beschreibung und Berechnung grösserer Maschinenanlagen. Sollinger, Vienna 1834

References

External links 

 Biography 

1756 births
1832 deaths
18th-century Bohemian people
19th-century German engineers
18th-century German engineers
German railway mechanical engineers
Bohemian nobility
People from Chomutov
Academic staff of Czech Technical University in Prague
German Bohemian people